Georgensgmünd station is a railway station in the municipality of Georgensgmünd, located in the Roth district in Middle Franconia, Bavaria, Germany.

References

Railway stations in Bavaria
Buildings and structures in Roth (district)